This page gathers the results of elections in Umbria.

Regional elections

Latest regional election

In the latest regional election, which took place on 27 October 2019, Donatella Tesei of Lega Nord (Lega Nord Umbria) was elected president by a landslide, ending 49 years of uninterrupted "reign" by the Italian Communist Party and its successors. The League was largely the largest party.

List of previous regional elections
1970 Umbrian regional election
1975 Umbrian regional election
1980 Umbrian regional election
1985 Umbrian regional election
1990 Umbrian regional election
1995 Umbrian regional election
2000 Umbrian regional election
2005 Umbrian regional election
2010 Umbrian regional election
2015 Umbrian regional election

 
Politics of Umbria